Ümit Sayın (born 26 April 1970) is a Turkish pop singer, composer and songwriter. Singer-songwriter Sezen Aksu, who was impressed by his voice at a concert in İzmir on 8 September 1990, and after performing a duet with him, she hired him as her backing vocalist. Sayın later worked as a backing vocalist for Harun Kolçak in 1992, Ajda Pekkan in 1993 and Tarkan in 1994–95. He began to write and compose songs in 1991 with the encouragement of Özkan Uğur and soon started to make songs for singers such as Harun Kolçak, Deniz Arcak, Emel Müftüoğlu, Erdal Çelik, Seden Gürel, Leman Sam, Hakan Peker, Burak Kut, İzel, Yeşim Salkım, Pınar Aylin, Suavi, Bendeniz, Tarkan, and Zeynep Dizdar. He continued his career successfully thanks to his musical relationship with Ozan Çolakoğlu. He released his self-titled debut album in 1992.

Studio albums

Singles

Contributions 

''* The list above includes songs given to other artists whose lyrics or music belong to Ümit Sayın. He has songs in his own albums that are written and composed by himself but are not mentioned in this list.

References 

1970 births
Musicians from İzmir
Turkish pop singers
Living people
Turkish singer-songwriters
Turkish folk-pop singers
21st-century Turkish singers
21st-century Turkish male singers